Omollo is a surname. Notable people with the name include:

 Brian Ouko Omollo (born 1990), stage name Khaligraph Jones, Kenyan rapper
 Cyprian Ojwang Omollo (died 2017), Kenyan politician
 Sammy Omollo (born 1970), Kenyan footballer